The 2018 Chinese Women's Football Championship was the 28th edition of the Chinese Women's Football Championship. Shanghai are the defending champions. It was held between 3 July to 14 July 2018.

Group stage

Group A

Group B

Group C

Group D

Play-offs

9th–16th-place play-offs

13th–16th-place play-offs

9th–12th-place play-offs

15th–16th-place play-off

13th–14th-place play-off

11th–12th-place play-off

9th–10th-place play-off

Quarter-finals

5th–8th-place play-offs

Semi-finals

7th–8th-place play-off

5th–6th-place play-off

3rd–4th-place play-off

Final

Notes

References

2018 in Chinese football
July 2018 sports events in China